Şırnak Şerafettin Elçi Airport  is a public airport near Cizre, a town in Şırnak Province, Turkey. It is named in honor of native politician Şerafettin Elçi (1938-2012).

Airlines and destinations

Traffic statistics

External links
 http://www.ucuyorum.com/showthread.php?577-ÅIRNAK-HavaalanÄ±-Projesi/page3
 http://www.dhmi.gov.tr/haberler.aspx?HaberID=1729
 http://www.hurriyetdailynews.com/sirnak-airport-set-to-open-in-four-months.aspx?pageID=238&nid=27310
 http://siyaset.milliyet.com.tr/baris-elci-si-havaalani/siyaset/detay/1736046/default.htm?ref=OtherNews

References

 

Airports in Turkey
Buildings and structures in Şırnak Province
Transport in Şırnak Province